The 2006 Bavaria World Darts Trophy was the fifth edition of the World Darts Trophy, a professional darts tournament held at the De Vechtsebanen in Utrecht, the Netherlands, run by the British Darts Organisation and the World Darts Federation.

Players from the Professional Darts Corporation competed for the first time, with five PDC players invited to the event. Gary Robson, the 2005 winner, and Jelle Klaasen, the BDO World Champion, were eliminated in the first round by Simon Whitlock and Tony Eccles, respectively. The final, featuring Phil Taylor, the PDC World Champion and in his first BDO major final for fourteen years, and Martin Adams, in his second straight World Darts Trophy final, was won by Taylor, 7–2 in sets. The women's event was replaced with a junior's event, with this being the only year a junior's event took place. Ron Meulenkamp won the junior's event.

Prize money

Men

Qualifiers

BDO / WDF / NDB 
  Gary Anderson
  Martin Adams
  Mervyn King
  Tony Eccles
  Martin Atkins
  Michael van Gerwen
  Niels de Ruiter
  John Walton
  Shaun Greatbatch
  Simon Whitlock
  Vincent van der Voort
  Paul Hanvidge
  Brian Sorensen
  Ted Hankey
  Paul Hogan
  Mike Veitch
  Gary Robson
  Co Stompé
  Tony O'Shea
  Göran Klemme
  Albertino Essers
  Tony Martin
  Jelle Klaasen
  Darryl Fitton
  Mareno Michels
  Dick van Dijk
  Dirk Hespeels

Professional Darts Corporation 
Five places were awarded to players from the PDC. Four places were awarded to the top four players in the PDC Order of Merit. A fifth place was awarded to Raymond van Barneveld, winner of the International Darts League.

PDC Order of Merit
  Colin Lloyd
  Phil Taylor
  Ronnie Baxter
  Peter Manley

IDL Winner
  Raymond van Barneveld

Men's tournament

Junior tournament

Television coverage 
The tournament was broadcast by SBS6 in the Netherlands, but was not shown in the UK. An internet feed from SBS was available. However, this may be restricted to the Netherlands only due to contractual restrictions.

References

External links 
2006 results Darts Database.
2006 results Darts Mad.
2006 results Master Caller.
2006 results PDC.

World Darts Trophy
World Darts Trophy
2006 in Dutch sport

nl:World Darts Trophy 2007